Leonard Partridge (22 June 1922 – 24 November 1977) was a New Zealand cricketer. He played seven first-class matches for Auckland between 1942 and 1951.

See also
 List of Auckland representative cricketers

References

External links
 

1922 births
1977 deaths
New Zealand cricketers
Auckland cricketers
Cricketers from Auckland
New Zealand Army cricketers
North Island Army cricketers